Trupanea stellata is a species of tephritid or fruit flies in the genus Trupanea of the family Tephritidae.

Distribution
United Kingdom, & Scandinavia East to Mongolia, South to North Africa, Middle East, Iran & India.

References

Tephritinae
Insects described in 1775
Diptera of Asia
Diptera of Europe
Diptera of Africa
Taxa named by Johann Kaspar Füssli